Juraj Štefanka (born 28 January 1976 in Nitra) is a Slovak professional ice hockey forward who currently plays in the Czech Extraliga.

Previously, Štefanka played for HC Slovan Bratislava, HC Karlovy Vary, HC Plzeň, HC Kladno, HC Vítkovice, HC Znojmo, HC Oceláři Třinec and HC Slavia Praha.

He also represented Slovakia at two IIHF World Championships in ice hockey.

References

1976 births
Living people
Slovak ice hockey forwards
HC Slavia Praha players
HC Slovan Bratislava players
HC Vítkovice players
HC Karlovy Vary players
Rytíři Kladno players
HC Plzeň players
Sportspeople from Nitra
Slovak expatriate ice hockey players in the Czech Republic
Slovak expatriate sportspeople in France
Expatriate ice hockey players in France